Giovanni Fornari was an Italian diplomat, Italian Governor of the Trust Territory of Somaliland, which was again placed under Italian administration after British occupation in 1950.

Biography 
Prior to World War II, Somalia was an Italian colony, but was taken by British forces in 1941. After Somaliland was again placed under Italian control by the United Nations, the focus of the new administration was largely one of economic development for the inhabitants. Illiteracy was widespread and facilities were few and far between (the war also took a toll on the colony), and Governor Fornari's responsibilities were different than those of his predecessors.

Upon entering into office, Fornari promised rewards to Somalis that supported and assisted in fully restoring Italian rule, which prompted the newly-formed Somali Youth League to send a letter of complaints to the UN advisory council. Fornari served as Governor until 1953.

See also
List of colonial governors of Italian Somaliland

References

1903 births
Italian diplomats
20th-century diplomats
Governors of Italian Somaliland
People of former Italian colonies
Italian East Africa
Italian colonial governors and administrators
Year of death missing